Coleophora concolorella is a moth of the family Coleophoridae. It is found in North America, including Ontario and Pennsylvania.

The larvae feed on the seeds of Juncus tenuis and Juncus compactus. They create a trivalved, tubular silken case.

References

concolorella
Moths described in 1863
Moths of North America